Ordre Nouveau ("New Order") was a far-right neo-fascist movement created on 15 December 1969. The first president was the lawyer Jean-François Galvaire (who worked for Roland Gaucher, a former member of the National Popular Rally).
After the departure of Jean-François Galvaire, in May 1970, the new political bureau comprised 
Emmanuel Allot (François Brigneau), Jacques Charasse, François Duprat, Louis Ecorcheville, Gabriel Jeantet, Claude Joubert, Paul Léandri, Hugues Leclère, Jean-Claude Nourry and Alain Robert. In June 1972, Ordre Nouveau joined with Jean-Marie Le Pen's movement in the Front National. José Bruneau de La Salle joined the political bureau, while Jean-Claude Nourry, Patrice Janeau and Michel Bodin left the movement. On 5 October 1972 the Front National was formed. 

On 21 June 1973 the militants of Ordre Nouveau attending a meeting "Halte à l'immigration sauvage" (stop uncontrolled immigration) clashed violently with those of the Ligue Communiste. This led to the ban of both organizations by the minister of Interior Raymond Marcellin. Some members of Ordre Nouveau (François Brigneau, Gabriel Jeantet, Alain Robert, José Bruneau de la Salle) went to found the Parti des forces nouvelles.

References

Far-right political parties in France
French Fifth Republic
Neo-fascist organizations